Wendy Lee may refer to:

 Wendee Lee (born 1960), American voice actress and director
 Wendy Lee (swimmer) (born 1960), Canadian swimmer
 Wendy J.N. Lee American filmmaker

See also
Wendy Lee Gramm, American economist, born Wendy Lee